Ethadione is an anticonvulsant medication in the oxazolidinedione family used mainly to treat seizures.

References 

Oxazolidinediones